The Second Kurz government ( or Kurz II for short) was the 33rd Government of Austria. Led by Sebastian Kurz as chancellor and Werner Kogler as vice-chancellor, it was sworn in by President Alexander Van der Bellen on 7 January 2020. It was officially dissolved and succeeded by the Schallenberg government on 11 October 2021.

This government represents many firsts. Headed by a former chancellor who had been ousted in a parliamentary vote of no confidence and made a comeback by winning the 2019 legislative election, it marks an alliance of a centre-right Austrian People's Party (ÖVP) with the centre-left The Greens as junior partner in the national government; it was the only such coalition in Europe until June 2020. It also features a majority of female cabinet members. Chancellor Kurz himself is the youngest member of his own government and the youngest chief executive of any of the European Union's member states for the second time. The new political alliance is closely watched in Europe, especially in neighbouring Germany, as it could become the prototype for a new type of politics in which ascendant conservatives make common cause with green parties to tackle climate change, which has become a salient concern of voters.

The Second Kurz government succeeded the Bierlein government, a nonpartisan caretaker administration installed on 3 June 2019 to run Austria following the collapse of the First Kurz government in the wake of the Ibiza affair involving its coalition partner, the far-right Freedom Party (FPÖ). The termination of the coalition of Kurz's party with the FPÖ was followed by a vote of no confidence in Parliament and snap election in which voter support for the FPÖ dropped sharply and support for the Greens surged to nearly 14%, its highest level ever. The ÖVP emerged victorious with 37% of the popular vote. Although the ÖVP won the election, it did not achieve a parliamentary majority in the National Council and therefore had to look for a junior coalition partner.

History

Demographics
The Second Kurz government is the first government in Austrian history in which women constitute the majority; it is also the youngest on average. Sebastian Kurz reclaimed the distinction of being the youngest head of government in Europe, aged 33. The youthfulness of the government also mirrors a younger electorate, Austria having lowered the voting age to 16, the lowest in Europe.

The Second Kurz government includes one cabinet member who is not a native Austrian, but came to the country as a refugee when she was a child, an element of personal biography she shares with President Alexander Van der Bellen.

Unprecedented coalition

Sebastian Kurz, chairman of the People's Party, reached an agreement on a coalition with the centre-left Greens at the end of 2019, putting him on track to become chancellor of Austria for the second time, with Werner Kogler, leader of The Greens, as vice-chancellor. This marked a breakthrough for The Greens as it would be represented in the executive branch of government at the national level for the first time. The Greens had previously unsuccessfully participated in coalition talks at the national level and served as coalition partners in several state governments.

The novel form of the political partnership paved the way for the ÖVP to maintain its conservative line on immigration, but also put Austria on the forefront of the fight against climate change, with a Green minister in charge of that portfolio and an action plan towards carbon neutrality on a pace faster than the rest of the EU. Kurz and Kogler differ not only in age, but also in style and manner of speech. Notwithstanding the odd-couple nature of the match, they have developed a good working relationship. Unlike Kurz, Kogler had to obtain the approval of his rank and file to enter the coalition government on the terms spelled out in the formal coalition agreement that the two party leaders had finalised and announced on New Year's Day. This was required by the charter of The Greens, which reflects its founders' commitment to grassroots democracy, while the ÖVP is more hierarchical and dominated by its constituent organisations in the corporatist tradition.

On 4 January 2020, more than 93 percent of the delegates at a special Green Congress convened in Salzburg backed the deal hammered out by the negotiating teams of the two parties and their leaders in more than two months of bargaining that covered the full spectrum of public policies, rather than just environmental issues. In the floor debate, misgivings were expressed about too many concessions having been made in reaching a deal on a joint government programme that both parties and their respective supporters in the electorate can agree on. Some delegates expressed dissent in the areas of civil liberties and treatment of asylum seekers and migrants. They deplored the Greens' yielding on core humanitarian principles.

In recognition of internal party dissension, Kogler stressed on many occasions the need to practice political realism. Assuming responsibility for governing the country with the ÖVP offered the Greens an opportunity to participate directly in the shaping of the future course of public policy for the very first time. "When if not now?" Kogler proclaimed, under a banner highlighting the spirit and motto of the congress: "Facing the future with boldness". He expressed hope to set an example for the rest of Europe with green and conservative parties working together in the national interest, as opposed to remaining merely on the sidelines as an opposition party in Parliament. In a separate floor vote, the Green rank and file approved the slate of Green ministers already designated unanimously by the party's expanded executive committee, with only one vote against and one abstention.

Composition 
The cabinet consists of:

Actions 
Under the People's Party, The Greens coalition plans, Austria will aim to become carbon neutral by 2040, a decade earlier than an EU-wide target, a pledge for all electricity to come from renewable sources by 2030, as well as more spending on public transport. The coalition deal also includes banning the headscarf in schools for girls up to age 14, an extension of the garment ban that applies until age 10 approved by lawmakers earlier this year. The agreement also revives a plan for “precautionary detention” of potentially dangerous asylum seekers.

See also 
Politics of Austria

Notes

References

External links 

2020 establishments in Austria
Cabinets established in 2020
Politics of Austria
Kurz II
2020s in Austria